Lawrence Hilton Jacobs, also credited as Lawrence-Hilton Jacobs (born September 4, 1953), is an American actor and singer. Best known for playing Freddie "Boom Boom" Washington in Welcome Back Kotter (1975–79), he has also appeared in a number of films and television shows, including Claudine (1974), Cooley High (1975), Roots (1977), Bangers and Mash (1983), Alien Nation (TV series) (1989–90), The Jacksons: An American Dream (1992), and 31 (2016).

Life and career
Jacobs was born in New York City, New York, the fifth of nine children of parents Hilton Jacobs (died 2000) and Clothilda Jacobs (died 2008).  He began his acting career in the summer of 1969 and graduated from the High School of Art and Design in 1971. He attended Wilkes University for a short time before his acting career took off. Afterward, he studied acting with the Negro Ensemble Company and the Al Fann Theatrical Ensemble.
 
In 1975, he won the role of Freddie "Boom Boom" Washington on the ABC hit comedy series, Welcome Back, Kotter. Jacobs also starred in cult classic Cooley High in 1975, and two years later had a role in the block-buster ABC mini-series Roots. Jacobs starred in a few commercials over the years, including an early 1970s commercial for The United Negro College Fund. Later in his career, he appeared in the 1989-1990 science fiction TV series Alien Nation as Sgt. Dobbs, an LAPD detective. He portrayed Panda Thomas (#1) in Rob Zombie's slasher film 31.
 
Jacobs portrayed Joseph Walter "Joe" Jackson, the father of the Jackson family, in the 1992 miniseries The Jacksons: An American Dream. He also appeared in a commercial for Salon Selectives.
 
Jacobs sang on Rick James' 1981 album, Street Songs.
 
As a homage to him, the housing project in Eddie Murphy's television program The PJs is named the Hilton-Jacobs Projects.
 
He has two daughters.

Filmography

Film/Movie

Television

Music credits 
 Lawrence Hilton Jacobs S/T (1978)
 All the Way...Love (1979)
 Let Me Do It (1981) (producer); performed by Halo; sought-after record among collectors.

References

External links

 

 

1953 births
Male actors from New York City
African-American male actors
American male singers
American male film actors
American male television actors
Living people
High School of Art and Design alumni
20th-century African-American male singers
21st-century African-American people